The Caparo T1 engine is a 3.5-liter, naturally-aspirated, V-8 racing engine, designed, developed, and made by Menard, and used in the Caparo T1 sports car, between 2006 and 2015. The engine itself is derived from the Nissan/Infiniti IndyCar engine, only slightly detuned.

Overview 
The engine has gone through several designs, previously including a smaller 2.4-litre supercharged unit. In addition, the engine has been reported to successfully reach  on methanol fuel. The engine is controlled via a fully tunable Pectel SQ6 engine control unit and the throttle is controlled via a throttle-by-wire system.

Applications
Caparo T1

References

V8 engines